Juan Ignacio Chela and Łukasz Kubot were the defending champions, but decided not to participate.
Daniele Bracciali and Potito Starace won the title, defeating Julian Knowle and David Marrero 3–6, 6–4, [10–8] in the final.

Seeds

Draw

Draw

References
 Doubles Draw

BRD Nastase Tiriac Trophy - Doubles
Romanian Open